James David Landis (born June 30, 1942) is an American author and a former publisher and editor in chief of William Morrow and Company.

Early life and career
Landis was born in Springfield, Massachusetts. He is the son of Russian/Polish Jewish parents Eve (Saltman), a teacher, and Edward Landis, a lawyer and amateur banjo player. He was educated in Springfield public schools, where he played football and was captain of the tennis team and won the Williams College Book Prize; and Yale College, from which he graduated in 1964, magna cum laude and a junior-year Phi Beta Kappa and where he wrote for The Yale Record, a humor magazine. While in high school he earned spending money playing the alto saxophone and clarinet in a jazz dance quartet.

Landis became a book editor in New York City in 1966, for one year at Abelard-Schuman and for the next 24 years at William Morrow and Company, where he advanced from Editor to Senior Vice-President, Publisher and Editor-in-Chief. As a book editor, he won the PEN/Roger Klein Award for Editing in 1973 and the Advocate Humanitarian Award in 1977 for his contributions to the advancement of gay writing and publishing. He retired from publishing in 1991.

The writers he edited and/or published included Robert Pirsig, Leroi Jones, Ken Follett, Pamela Des Barres, Nicholas Delbanco, James Clavell, Mick Fleetwood, Jacqueline Susann, Tariq Ali, Morris West, Sidney Sheldon, Harry Crews, John Irving, Salvador Dalí, Whitley Streiber and Patricia Nell Warren.

His books include Lying in Bed, which won the Morton Dauwen Zabel Award from the American Academy of Arts and Letters, Longing, which was a New York Times Notable Book, The Taking, which was published in paperback under the title Artist of the Beautiful, The Last Day, and  Dagny: The Life and Death of Dagny Juel as Narrated by Her Lover W. E., which is available only in Polish translation as Dagny, Życie I ŚmierĆ (Dagny: Life and Death). He also published a book of poetry for children, Cars on Mars and 49 Other Poems for Kids on Earth.

Personal life
J. D. Landis is married to Denise Landis, a longtime recipe tester for The New York Times and the author of multiple cookbooks.

Works
 The Sisters Impossible (1979, Knopf;  / 1984, Bantam;  / 1990, Random House Books for Young Readers)
 Daddy's Girl (1984, William Morrow & Co;  / 1985, Simon Pulse)
 Love's Detective (1984, Bantam)
 Joey and the Girls (1987, Bantam)
 Looks Aren't Everything (1990, Delacorte Books for Young Readers;  / 1991, Starfire)
 Cars on Mars and 49 Other Poems for Kids on Earth, with illustrations by Denise Landis (2008, Publishing Works)
 Lying in Bed (1995, Algonquin;  / 1997, PHOENIX)
 Longing (2000, Houghton Mifflin Harcourt;  / 2001, Ballantine Books)
 The Taking (2003, Ballantine;  / 2005, Ballantine, as Artist of the Beautiful)
 The Last Day (2009, Steerforth) 
 ''Dagny, Życie I ŚmierĆ (Dagny: Life and Death) (2013, Bukowy Las)

References

External links
 

1942 births
20th-century American novelists
21st-century American novelists
American editors
American male novelists
Living people
Writers from Springfield, Massachusetts
20th-century American male writers
21st-century American male writers
Novelists from Massachusetts
Yale College alumni